There are over 20,000 Grade II* listed buildings in England. This page is a list of these buildings in the London Borough of Waltham Forest.

Buildings

|}

See also
 Grade II listed buildings in the London Borough of Waltham Forest

Notes

External links
 

 
 Waltham Forest
Lists of Grade II* listed buildings in London